The compositional career of the British composer Alan Bush extended from the early 1920s to the mid-1980s. He died aged 94 in 1995. His oeuvre includes large-scale orchestral and/or choral works,   operas and other theatrical music, chamber music,  piano works, brass band arrangements and songs.   This list of his compositions   is mainly drawn from the list included in Alan Bush: Music, Politics and Life (Thames Publishing, London 2000), pp. 146–164. Details that are not given in this main source have been added on the basis of information provided in the "Compositions" pages of the Alan Bush Music Trust website.

A separate listing is given of the shorter songs and choruses composed or arranged by Bush for the Workers' Music Association and other choirs with which he was associated during his working life.

List of compositions by genre

Songs and arrangements 
The Alan Bush Music Trust 
1926 "Song to Labour"    
1930 "Song to Freedom"  
1931 "Question and Answer "  
1934 "Song of the Hunger Marchers"  
1935 "Red Front" 
1936 "Labour's Song of Challenge" 
1939 "Make your Meaning Clear " 
1939 "Against the People's Enemies " 
1939 "Song of the Peace-Lovers " 
1940 "The Ice Breaks" 
1940 "Freedom on the Air" 
1940 "March of the Workers " 
1941 "Unite And Be Free" 
1942 "Britain's Part " 
1944 "Comrade Dear, Come Home " 
1944 "Song of the Commons of England" 
1946  Twenty "Sing for Pleasure" songs  accompanied or unaccompanied singing 
1946 "A World for Living "  
1948 "The Internationale" (arrangement)
1950 "Shining Vision : Song for Peace "   
1969 Four songs of Asian struggle (arrangements)
1982 "N'kosi Sikeleli Afrika" (African National Congress Anthem) (arrangement)
1985 "It's up to Us"  
undated:  "From the Five Continents   
undated:  Miscellaneous Folk Song Arrangements (published 1965)
undated:  "Once is Enough"    
undated:  "Song of Age "    
undated: "Song of the Engineers" 
undated:  "Song of the Peatbog Soldiers" (arrangement of song written in a German concentration camp)
undated:  "The Sailor"  
undated:  "There's a Reason" (published 1971)
undated:  "Till Right is Done"

References

Notes

Citations

Source book

Bush